Lillien Blanche Fearing (27 November 1863 – 1901) was an American lawyer and poet who was blind.

Life
Fearing was born in Davenport, Iowa in 1863. She lost her sight as the result of an accident whilst playing with other children when she was five or six. She was taught in college in Vinton, Iowa until 1884.

Four years later she moved to Chicago to study at the Union College of Law and graduated in 1890. Her sister and mother served as her amanuensis while she learned, and she became a leading pupil and she also started to write poetry. She was one of four students who shared the scholarship prize when they graduated in 1890. She was the only woman studying law in her year.

She was admitted to the Illinois Bar at Springfield and was able to practice law from her office in Chicago.

She died in 1901 after her third book "Mildred" was published.

Works
  "The Sleeping World, and other Poems" (Chicago, 1887)
  "In the City by the Lake" (Chicago, 1893).
  "Mildred" (Chicago, 1901)

References

1863 births
1901 deaths
People from Davenport, Iowa
American lawyers
Blind writers
19th-century American poets
American women poets
19th-century American women writers
Wikipedia articles incorporating text from A Woman of the Century
19th-century American women lawyers
19th-century American lawyers